Sevilla Futbol Club Juvenil are the under-19 team of Spanish professional football club Sevilla. 
The Juvenil A team plays in the Group IV of the División de Honor Juvenil de Fútbol where their main rivals are Real Betis and Málaga. 

They also participate in the national Copa de Campeones Juvenil and the Copa del Rey Juvenil, qualification for which is dependent on final league group position, and have taken part in the continental UEFA Youth League.

Juvenil A

Current squad

Season to season (Juvenil A)

Superliga / Liga de Honor sub-19 
Seasons with two or more trophies shown in bold

División de Honor Juvenil 
Seasons with two or more trophies shown in bold

Honours 
National competitions
 División de Honor: 15
1995–96, 1996–97, 1997–98, 1998–99, 1999–2000, 2003–04, 2004–05, 2007–08, 2008–09, 2010–11, 2011–12, 2012–13, 2015–16, 2018–19, 2019–20
 Copa de Campeones: 4
1990–91, 1994–95, 2012, 2013
 Copa del Rey: 6
1962, 1979, 1997, 2008, 2009, 2014

Juvenil B

Current squad

See also
Sevilla Atlético
Sevilla FC C

References

Juvenil A
Football academies in Spain
División de Honor Juvenil de Fútbol
UEFA Youth League teams